Wireless conference system is the conference system that the communication between conference microphones and system control unit does not depend on by various cables but by modulating wireless signal. The development history of wireless conference system is as below:

Firstly, the communication system is based on the digital modulating signal based on infrared ray, which is evolved from IR interpretation system. Secondly, the technique applied in wireless conference system is 2.4 GHz modulating signal, which support more stable communication and avoid environment interference caused by buildings, sun lights and others.

As more digital appliances based 2.4GHz frequency band, it could be easy to interfere with the communication of 2.4G wireless conference system. Consequently, 5.8 GHz frequency band is applied in some wireless conference systems. In some cases, there are dual-band conference system that could change the communication frequency band in according to the usage of the frequency points. They are also susceptible to less interference than 2.4 GHz phones, but Wi-Fi networks in the faster 8.02.11n standard do interfere with 5.8 GHz.

References

Wireless